The 1928 Chicago Cardinals season was their ninth in the National Football League. The team failed to improve on their previous output of 3–7–1, winning only one game. They finished ninth in the league.

The team scored only 7 points during the season, 6 on a single touchdown on an interception by Hal Erickson against the Dayton Triangles.  Jim Thorpe also played one game (his last) for this team.

Schedule

Standings

References

Arizona Cardinals seasons
Chicago Cardinals
Chicago